Siege of Pemaquid refers to events at Pemaquid, Maine:
Siege of Pemaquid (1689) (capture and destruction of the fort by Indians)
Siege of Pemaquid (1696) (capture and destruction of the new fort by a French-Indian force)